The 1997–98 Czech 2. Liga was the fifth season of the 2. česká fotbalová liga, the second tier of the Czech football league. Ústí nad Labem did not fulfil their fixtures and their results were cancelled.

League standings

Top goalscorers

See also 
 1997–98 Czech First League
 1997–98 Czech Cup

References

 Official website 

Czech 2. Liga seasons
Czech
2